Love is Colder Than Death is a 1969 West German black-and-white film directed by Rainer Werner Fassbinder, his first feature film. In the original theater presentation in Berlin the title was first Kälter als der Tod; at the beginning of film production, it was Liebe – kälter als der Tod as on some film posters. The cinematographer Dietrich Lohmann and the cast as an ensemble won an award at the German Film Awards in 1970.

Plot
Petty hood Franz (Fassbinder) refuses to join the syndicate, where he meets a handsome young thug called Bruno (Lommel) and gives him his address in Munich. It is the flat of the prostitute Joanna (Schygulla), where Franz lives as her pimp. Bruno has been ordered by the syndicate to follow Franz and on going to the address is told he has moved. So he goes round the streets of the city asking prostitutes if they know a prostitute called Joanna.

Eventually he finds where the pair are hiding, because Franz is being sought by a Turk for killing his brother. Bruno offers to solve the problem, so the three go to the café where the Turk can be found and shoot him. As they leave, Bruno also shoots the waitress who is the only witness. Franz is picked up by the police for both killings and, while he is held for questioning, Joanna starts an affair with Bruno.

When Franz is freed because the police have no evidence, the three then plan a bank robbery. As they arrive outside, plain clothes police appear and Bruno is killed in a shootout while Franz and Joanna get away. In the car she tells him she had tipped the cops off about the robbery.  He says "Nutte" [whore] and keeps on driving as the film fades to white.

Cast

 Ulli Lommel – Bruno
 Rainer Werner Fassbinder – Franz
 Hanna Schygulla – Joanna
 Katrin Schaake – Woman on train
 Liz Soellner – Newspaper Saleswoman
 Gisela Otto – Prostitute
 Ursula Strätz – Prostitute
 Monika Stadler – Waitress
 Hans Hirschmüller – Peter
 Les Olvides – Georges
 Peer Raben – Jürgen 
 Howard Gaines – Raoul
 Peter Moland – Interrogator
 Kurt Raab – Department Store Detective
 Peter Berling – Weapons Seller
 Anastassios Karalas – Turkish Man

Reception
Initial reception was generally negative, and the film was even booed at the 19th Berlin International Film Festival in 1969. Today, however, it is seen as a fine example of Fassbinder's early style, with a heavy 'nouvelle vague' influence.

The film is dedicated to "Claude Chabrol, Éric Rohmer, Jean-Marie Straub, Linio, and Cuncho".  The last two refer to the main characters in Damiano Damiani's 1966 film A Bullet for the General. Ulli Lommel's styling (and also the poster artwork) is inspired by Alain Delon in Le Samouraï.

References

External links 
 
 Criterion Collection essay by Michael Koresky

1969 films
1960s avant-garde and experimental films
1969 crime films
German avant-garde and experimental films
German gangster films
West German films
1960s German-language films
Films directed by Rainer Werner Fassbinder
German black-and-white films
Films about prostitution in Germany
Films set in Munich
1969 directorial debut films
1960s German films